The Reina Nacional de Belleza Miss República Dominicana 2006 pageant was held on October 17, 2005. Only 22 candidates competed for the national crown. The chosen winner represented the Dominican Republic at the Miss International 2006 pageant which was held in Tokyo. The first runner up represented the country in Miss Mesoamerica. The second runner up represented the country in Reina Nacional del Café. The third runner up represented the country in Miss Atlantico. The fourth runner up represented the country in Reina Mundial del Banano. The fifth runner up represented the country in Miss Tourism Queen International 2006. The rest of the finalists entered different pageants.

Results

Special awards
 Miss Photogenic (voted by press reporters) - Yamel Mora (Río San Juan)
 Miss Congeniality (voted by contestants) - Evelyn Lora (Salcedo)
 Best Provincial Costume - Francia Aquino (Barahona)

Delegates

Trivia
Pamela Cruz, Miss Higüey entered in Miss Dominican Republic 2005.
Jennifer Peña, Miss Santiago would win Miss Miss República Dominicana USA 2007 and would enter in Miss Dominican Republic 2008.
The winner Wilma abreu, Miss Monte Plata and Hareld Mossle, Miss Monte Cristi entered in Miss Mundo Dominicana 2004. Wilma was first runner up.

External links
Video of RNB 2006
Candidatas al RNB Miss República Dominicana 2006

Miss Dominican Republic
2006 beauty pageants
2006 in the Dominican Republic